Grass Creek drains Grass Lake and flows north before emptying into Black Lake near Rossie, New York.

References 

Rivers of St. Lawrence County, New York
Rivers of New York (state)